The Ford Maverick is a compact car manufactured and marketed by Ford for model years 1970–1977 in the United States, originally as a two-door sedan employing a rear-wheel drive platform original to the 1960 Falcon — and subsequently as a four-door sedan on the same platform.

The Maverick was also manufactured in Venezuela, Canada, Mexico, and from 1970 to 1979, in Brazil.

The name "maverick" was derived from the word for unbranded range animals, and the car's nameplate was stylized to resemble the head of Longhorn cattle.

History
The Maverick was introduced on April 17, 1969, as a 1970 model at a very competitive price point of $1,995 ($ in  dollars ). It was originally conceived and marketed as a subcompact "import fighter", intended to compete against the newer Japanese rivals for North America, then primarily from Datsun and Toyota.  The Falcon, Ford's compact offering since 1960 and main rival to the Chevrolet Nova and Dodge Dart, had seen its sales decimated by the introduction of the Mustang in 1964, and despite a redesign in 1966, was unable to meet the then forthcoming U.S. National Highway Traffic Safety Administration  motor-vehicle standards that would come into effect on January 1, 1970. Consequently, the Falcon was discontinued midway through the 1970 model year, and the Maverick repositioned as Ford's compact entry, giving the Nova and Dart a new rival. A bigger Falcon was a rebranded low-trim version of the Fairlane for the second half of the model year, then went away.

The Maverick's styling featured the long hood, fastback roof, and short deck popularized by the Mustang, on a  wheelbase — and featured pop-out rear side windows.

Nearly 579,000 Mavericks were produced in its first year, approaching the record-setting first year of Mustang sales (nearly 619,000), and easily outpaced the Mustang's sales of fewer than 200,000 in 1970.
Total North American Maverick production (1969-1977) reached 2.1 million units.

Jumping gas prices and increasing demand for smaller cars resulting from the 1973 oil crisis caused the Maverick to grow in popularity. Maverick production continued for 1975 with the release of its intended replacement the Granada as a more European-style luxury compact (the Granada and Maverick shared the same basic chassis).

Trim packages and variants

Initially available only as a two-door sedan, early models lacked a glove compartment, which was added during the model year 1973 (early 1973 models still lacked a glove compartment). A four-door sedan on a  wheelbase was introduced for 1971.

At introduction, exterior paint colors were named with puns, including "Anti-Establish Mint", "Hulla Blue", "Original Cinnamon", "Freudian Gilt", and "Thanks Vermillion" — along with more typical names including black jade, champagne gold, gulfstream aqua, meadowlark yellow, Brittany blue, lime gold, Dresden blue, raven black, Wimbledon white, and candyapple red.

In the first half of production for the 1970 model, two engine options were available, a   straight-six and a   straight-six. A  straight-six was added mid-year.

For the 1970 model only the 170 cu in (2,800 cc) straight-six had an option for a 3 speed semi-automatic gearbox.

Commercials and advertising compared the Maverick, at $1,995, to the smaller Volkswagen Beetle, which was about $500 less in price. The Pinto was later Ford's primary competitor to the Beetle in the subcompact class, while also competing in that segment with the Chevrolet Vega and AMC Gremlin subcompacts new to the market at that time.

The earliest Mavericks featured two-spoke steering wheels with partial horn rings, also found on other 1969 Fords, while late 1969 production was changed to revised steering wheels with no horn rings. Also, the early models located the ignition switch in the instrument panel, while the cars built after September 1, 1969, had the ignition switches mounted on locking steering columns, as did all other 1970 Fords in compliance with a new federal safety mandate that took effect with the 1970 model year.

A four-door model was introduced for 1971, available with a vinyl roof. Mercury also revived the Comet as a rebadged variant of the Maverick. Also for 1971, an optional  302 CID V8 was introduced for both the Comet and the Maverick. The Comet was distinguished from the Maverick by using a different grille, taillights, trim, and hood.

The Maverick Grabber trim package was introduced in mid-1970. In addition to larger tire fitment, the package included graphics and trim, including a spoiler. It was offered from 1970 to 1975. In 1971 and 1972, the Grabber came with a special "dual dome" hood.

A "sprint" package offered for 1972 featured white and blue two-toned paint with red pinstripes and a special color-coordinated interior. The rear quarter panels included a stylized U.S.A. flag shield. This trim package acknowledged the 1972 Olympics and was available for only one year.

A "luxury decor option" (LDO) trim level introduced late in the 1972 model year included reclining bucket seats in a soft vinyl material, plush carpeting, wood-grained instrument panel trim, radial tires with body-color deluxe wheel covers, and a vinyl roof. The Maverick LDO option was one of the first American compacts to be marketed as a lower-priced (and domestic) alternative to the more expensive European luxury and touring sedans from Mercedes-Benz, BMW, Audi, and others.

Minor changes were made from 1973 to 1975. For 1973, the 170 CID engine was dropped, making the 200 CID I6 the standard engine. Additionally, improved brakes and a previously optional chrome grille became standard. An AM/FM stereo, aluminum wheels, and a slightly larger front bumper to comply with federal 5 MPH regulations were also standard. In 1974, the Maverick was unchanged except for new larger federally required 5 MPH bumpers for both front and rear, which required new rear quarter panel end caps.

The Maverick received minor trim changes for 1975 that included new grilles and the replacement of nameplates on the hood and trunk lid with Ford nameplates, in block letters.

In 1976, the Grabber was dropped, and a "Stallion" package was introduced. The Stallion option came with special paint and trim.  Standard Mavericks received new grilles and gained front disc brakes as standard equipment along with new foot-operated parking brakes that replaced the old under-dash T-handle units. Sales continued to drop.

In its final year, the Maverick remained unchanged for 1977 except for a police package, which was not sufficiently upgraded for police work and sold less than 400 units. The Maverick was produced in Brazil until 1979. The Maverick's place in the North American Ford lineup was essentially taken by the 1978 Fairmont. The Maverick had no significant changes towards the end of its lifespan, since it was originally meant to be replaced in 1975 by the Granada. However, Ford decided to keep selling both lines until the 1978 model year introduction of the Fairmont.

Gallery

See also
 Nissan Patrol for the Australian Ford Maverick of 1988 to 1994
 Nissan Terrano II for the European Ford Maverick of 1993 to 1999
 Ford Escape for the European Ford Maverick of 2001 to 2008

References

External links

 Ford Maverick.com - History, articles, owners
 "Maverick: Ford's Big New Small Car." Popular Science, April 1969, pp. 83–85.

Maverick
Compact cars
Rear-wheel-drive vehicles
Sedans
Cars introduced in 1970
Muscle cars
Motor vehicles manufactured in the United States
Cars discontinued in 1979